Surovka is a rural locality (a village) in Mikhaylovsky Selsoviet, Ufimsky District, Bashkortostan, Russia. The population was 421 as of 2010. There are 24 streets.

Geography 
Surovka is located 19 km north of Ufa (the district's administrative centre) by road. Mikhaylovka is the nearest rural locality.

References 

Rural localities in Ufimsky District